At about a population of 60,000 (30,000 of which speak Sorbian), the Sorbs are the smallest Slavic-speaking
group in Europe.

This is a list of notable Sorbs.

Historical
Czimislav (839 - 840) - 9th-century King of the Sorbs
Jakub Bart-Ćišinski (1856–1909) - Poet, writer, playwright, and translator
Jan Kilian (1811–1884) - Pastor and leader of the Sorbian colony in Texas
Korla Awgust Kocor (1822–1904) - Composer and conductor
Ludwig Leichhardt (1813–1848) - Explorer and naturalist
Jan Arnošt Smoler (1816–1884) - Philologist and writer
Handrij Zejler (1804–1872) - Writer, pastor, and national activist
Pavle Jurišić Šturm - Paulus Eugen Sturm (1848–1922) - Serbian general, Sorbian origin

Contemporary
Jurij Brězan (1916–2006) - Writer, novelist, and author of children's books
Jurij Koch (b. 1936) - Writer, editor, and reporter
John Symank (1935–2002) - Head coach for Northern Arizona University and the University of Texas at Arlington football teams, defensive back in the NFL, and player for the University of Florida 
Mato Kosyk (1853–1940) - Poet and minister
Baldur von Schirach (1907-1974) - Nazi German politician and convicted war criminal
Kito Lorenc (1938–2017) - Writer, lyric poet, and translator
Kurt Krjeńc (1907–1978) – East German politician and Chairman of Domowina
Erwin Strittmatter (1912–1994)
Stanislaw Tillich (b. 1959)
Mina Witkojc (1893–1975)
Carolina Eyck (b. 1987)
Peter Schowtka (1945–2022), member of the Landtag of Saxony

See also
Sorbs

Sorbs